Apriona aphetor is a species of beetle in the family Cerambycidae. It was described by Newman in 1842. It is known from Sumatra and the Philippines.

Subspecies
 Apriona aphetor aphetor (Newman, 1842)
 Apriona aphetor francottei Jiroux, 2011

References

Batocerini
Beetles described in 1842